The Play-offs of the 2013 Fed Cup Asia/Oceania Zone Group II were the final stages of the Group II Zonal Competition involving teams from Asia and Oceania. Using the positions determined in their pools, the eleven teams faced off to determine their placing in the 2013 Fed Cup Asia/Oceania Zone Group II. The top team advanced to 2014 Asia/Oceania Zone Group I.

Promotional Round
The first placed teams of each pool played in a head-to-head round. The winner advanced to the Group I for 2014.

Hong Kong vs. Indonesia

3rd to 4th play-off
The second placed teams of each pool played in a head-to-head round to find the third and fourth placed teams.

New Zealand vs. Philippines

5th to 6th play-off
The third placed teams of each pool played in a head-to-head round to find the fifth and sixth placed teams.

Vietnam vs. Malaysia

7th to 8th play-off
The fourth placed teams of each pool played in a head-to-head round to find the seventh and eighth placed teams.

Turkmenistan vs. Kyrgyzstan

9th to 10th play-off
The fifth placed teams of each pool played in a head-to-head round to find the ninth and tenth placed teams.

Singapore vs. Pakistan

Final Placements

  advanced to the Fed Cup Asia/Oceania Zone Group I for 2014, but they placed last in their pool and thus was sent to the relegation play-offs. They lost, and therefore was relegated back to Group II for 2015.

See also
Fed Cup structure

References

External links
 Fed Cup website

2013 Fed Cup Asia/Oceania Zone